Diglum is a rural locality in the Gladstone Region, Queensland, Australia.

History 
Dan Dan State School opened on 1920 and closed on 1930. Dan Dan Creek is located within Diglum.

Road infrastructure
The Gladstone–Monto Road  runs along the north-eastern boundary.

References 

Gladstone Region
Localities in Queensland